Xie Zhen is a fictional character in Water Margin, one of the Four Great Classical Novels in Chinese literature. Nicknamed "Double-headed Serpent", he ranks 34th among the 36 Heavenly Spirits, the first third of the 108 Stars of Destiny.

Background
The novel depicts Xie Zhen as seven chi tall, powerfully built and having a purplish face, wide shoulders and a narrow waist. Nicknamed "Double-headed Serpent", Xie Zhen usually wears the hide of a tiger or a leopard as his outer garment. Skilled in martial arts, agile in climbing hills and able to endure bad weathers, Xie Zhen and his younger brother Xie Bao each use a bronze forked spear in hunting, which is also their weapon in combat.

Joining Liangshan
The governor of Dengzhou (登州; in present-day eastern Shandong) orders Xie Zhen and Xie Bao, the best among local hunters, to hunt down a tiger in three days which has preyed on travelers on a ridge, failing which they would face severe punishment. On the second night, the brothers trap the tiger, corner it on a cliff, and fire poison arrows at it. The tiger falls off the cliff and lands in the backyard of the mansion of one Squire Mao. As they are clambering down the hill, Squire Mao orders his son Mao Zhongyi to take the tiger, now dead, to the governor to claim reward.

Finding no tiger, the brothers are infuriated and smash the furniture in Mao's mansion before leaving. They run into Mao Zhongyi, who lures them back to his home where they are seized in an ambush. They are sent to the governor who jails them on the charge of theft. Squire Mao bribes the chief warden to murder them in prison.

Yue He, a jailer in the prison, happens to be related to them, his sister being the wife of Sun Li, whose brother Sun Xin is married to Gu Dasao, a cousin of the Xies. Sun Li is the commandant of Dezhou's garrison. Yue takes the news of the Xies to Sun Xin and Gu Dasao. The couple rope in Zou Yuan and Zou Run to help in the rescue. They also pressure Sun Li to join in. On the day of rescue, Yue He opens the prison gate to let in Gu Dasao, who pretends to bring food to the Xies. After admitting her, Yue unlocks the manacles that shackle the Xies to a bed. Once released, the Xies are like tigers released, charging out of their cell and smashing the chief warden to death as Gu creates havoc in the jail compound. Meanwhile, Sun Li and the others launch attack from the outside. After pulling off the rescue, the group kill Squire Mao and his family and flee to join the outlaw band of Liangshan.

Before going up to the stronghold, Sun Li volunteers to infiltrate the Zhu Family Village, which Liangshan has failed to take in two offensives. As Sun Li has received combat training from the same teacher as Luan Tingyu, the martial arts instructor of the village, he easily wins the confidence of the Zhus. Xie Zhen, together with Xie Bao, Sun Xin, Gu Dasao, Yue He, Zou Yuan and Zou Run, goes on a rampage inside the village, taking it by surprise, when Sun Li gives the signal. The fall of the Zhu Family Village is an immense contribution by the group before their formal acceptance into Liangshan.

Campaigns and death
The Xie brothers are appointed as leaders of the Liangshan infantry after the 108 Stars came together in what is called the Grand Assembly. Both participate in the campaigns against the Liao invaders and rebel forces in Song territory following amnesty from Emperor Huizong for Liangshan.

In the battle of Black Dragon Ridge (烏龍嶺; northeast of present-day Meicheng Town, Jiande, Zhejiang) in the campaign against Fang La, the Xie brothers disguise as hunters to recce the terrain. While climbing up the steep cliff, they are discovered by the enemy soldiers, who hurl grappling hooks at them. Caught, Xie Zhen cuts the ropes of the hooks and falls to his death. Xie Bao is crushed to death by the boulders and other debris thrown down at him.

See also
 List of Water Margin minor characters#Xie brothers' story for a list of supporting minor characters from Xie Zhen's story.

References
 
 
 
 
 
 
 

36 Heavenly Spirits
Fictional hunters
Fictional characters from Shandong